Asya was a ruler of the Kingdom of Diaokhi, a confederation of proto-Georgian tribes, who reigned around the middle of the 9th century BCE. He is known from Assyrian sources describing the military campaigns of Shalmaneser III.

Biography 
Asya is the second historically confirmed ruler of the Kingdom of Diaokhi, an ancient confederation of proto-Georgian tribes dominating northeast Anatolia. His reign took place in the middle of the 9th century BCE, shortly after the formation of the powerful neighboring Kingdom of Urartu. Like his predecessors, he belonged to Nairi, a political-military alliance of South Caucasus states.

In 845 BCE, he faced an invasion by Assyrian king Shalmaneser III, who had invaded Nairi states and ravaged Urartu. Asya rapidly agreed to submit to Assyrian suzerainty, protecting his kingdom from the destruction his southern neighbors faced.

After the invasion, Asya had to pay an annual tribute to Assyria and became a client king of the empire. In return, Shalmaneser III erected a large statue of Asya in the capital of Diaokhi.

Bibliography

References 

Kings of Diauehi
9th-century BC rulers